Jiang Tengyi (born January 30, 1985, in Shanghai) is a Chinese racing driver who drives for A1 Team China.

In 1998 he took part in the Chinese KART Cup and raced to third place. In 2000, he repeated his performance in the KART Title Match (International A Grade). He bettered his performance in 2001 with second place. He also won the Macao Jinmei Challenge. The next year, he was champion of the Shanghai TCL KART challenge and received a BMW Scholarship.

He was accepted in German Formula BMW in 2002 and was expected to race in Formula BMW Asia in 2003, but he turned down the chance because Shanghai Volkswagen sponsored him to race in German Formula Volkswagen.

After Formula Volkswagen was discontinued at the end of 2003, he earned a place in Italian Formula Renault in 2004. For the 2005–2006 season he earned a place in A1 Team China in the A1 Grand Prix series. He has since been replaced by Congfu Cheng and Tung Ho-Pin.

For 2007, he signed with Brooks Associates Racing to compete in the Champ Car Atlantic Championship, however he left the team and the series after only competing in 3 races after the race that sponsored him, the Champ Car Grand Prix of China was cancelled. Since 2008 he has raced part-time in the Asian Formula Renault Challenge.

In 2010, he raced for Changan Ford Racing in the China Touring Car Championship, finishing second overall in the 2000cc class.

Career results

Complete A1 Grand Prix results
(key) (Races in bold indicate pole position) (Races in italics indicate fastest lap)

Complete TCR International Series results
(key) (Races in bold indicate pole position) (Races in italics indicate fastest lap)

References

External links
 

1985 births
Living people
Sportspeople from Shanghai
Chinese racing drivers
A1 Team China drivers
Italian Formula Renault 2.0 drivers
Asian Formula Renault Challenge drivers
Atlantic Championship drivers
TCR International Series drivers

A1 Grand Prix drivers
TCR Asia Series drivers
Team Astromega drivers